Budny is a Polish and Belarusian surname. Notable people with the surname include:

 , 16th-century writer and translator in Belarus
 Edward Budny (born 1937), Polish cross-country skier
 Symon Budny (c. 1533–1593), Polish-Belarusian humanist and educator
 Weronika Budny (born 1941), Polish cross-country skier

See also
 

Belarusian-language surnames
Polish-language surnames